Double Negative may refer to:

In popular culture
 Double Negative (artwork), 1969 artwork on the Mormon Mesa in Nevada
 Double Negative (band), hardcore punk band based in North Carolina
 Double Negative (VFX), former name of DNEG, a London-based visual effects facility
 "Double Negative", a single release from British art rock band Grammatics
 Double Negative, 2004 album by The Muffins
 Double Negative: A Vicky Bauer Mystery, a 1988 book by Leona Gom
 Deadly Companion, 1980 film also known as Double Negative
 Double Negative, the fourth album by Steampunk band The Men That Will Not Be Blamed for Nothing
 Double Negative (album), 2018 album by Low

Science and mathematics
 Double negative (DN), T cells, also called CD4–CD8–
 Double negation in logic

Other
 Double negative, concept in linguistics
 Double negative (contract bridge), a type of bid

See also
 Double (disambiguation)
 Negative (disambiguation)
 Negative double, a type of bid within the game of contract bridge, distinct from double negative